Franz Babinger (15 January 1891 – 23 June 1967) was a well-known German orientalist and historian of the Ottoman Empire, best known for his biography of the great Ottoman emperor Mehmed II, known as "the Conqueror", originally published as Mehmed der Eroberer und seine Zeit. An English translation by Ralph Manheim is available from Princeton University Press under the title Mehmed the Conqueror and His Time. His many doctrines were speculative and not supported with evidence.

Life
Babinger was born in Weiden in der Oberpfalz, Bavaria, as the eldest of four children into a middle-class family, the father a Roman Catholic, the mother of Jewish background. He was already an accomplished academic and linguist by the time he had completed his secondary school studies. Prior to starting University, he had already learned both Persian and Hebrew.

Babinger completed his doctoral studies at the University of Munich on the eve of the First World War; after the war started, he joined the German Army. Because of his language skills and abilities, Babinger served in the Middle East, thus avoiding the deadly trench warfare that cut short the lives of many promising scholars of his generation.

After the war, Babinger continued his studies at Friedrich-Wilhelms Universität in Berlin where he completed his Habilitationsschrift in 1921 and became a professor at the same institution. During this period, he published Geschichtsschreiber der Osmanen und ihre Werke ("Historians of the Ottoman Empire"), which became the standard bibliographical review of Ottoman historiography and confirmed the reputation of Friedrich-Wilhelms Universität as a leading center for Near East studies. The rise of the Nazis to power in 1933 forced him to resign his position. However, the Romanian statesman, academic and polymath Nicolae Iorga, himself a widely respected historian of the Ottoman Empire, invited Babinger to take up a position in Bucharest, which he held until he was ordered out of the country in 1943.

Babinger resumed his teaching career after the Second World War at the University of Munich in 1948 until his retirement in 1958. In 1957, he testified about German atrocities against Romanian Jews. He was elected a member of the American Philosophical Society in 1964. He continued to work and publish actively until his accidental death by drowning in Albania on 23 June 1967.

Work
In addition to his bibliographical work, Babinger published numerous articles and books on a wide variety of subjects. Babinger knew Turkish, Romanian and Arabic as well as the principal European languages, giving his work a scope and authority that had hitherto rarely been displayed in Near Eastern studies.

As a result of his reputation, his magnum opus Mehmed the Conqueror was published without any accompanying notes on source material at all, since the companion volume outlining his extensive and voluminous sources was unfinished at the time of his death. As a result, Mehmed the Conqueror is one of the few academic works available with no cited sources and whose authority rests solely on the reputation of the author's research abilities. Critics like Prof. Halil Inalcik from the University of Ankara have said they were waiting for the author's promised second edition as stated in the preface of the book that would include the source material and bibliography; since such edition never saw the light, the students of the subject could easily recognize the source material, evidencing the use of biased bibliography exclusively.

Principal Publications
Geschichtsschreiber der Osmanen und ihre Werke (1923)
Mehmed der Eroberer und seine Zeit (1953)

References

External links
 

German biographers
Male biographers
German orientalists
1891 births
1967 deaths
Deaths by drowning
Accidental deaths in Albania
German male non-fiction writers
20th-century German historians
Members of the Lincean Academy
Ottoman studies
Members of the Göttingen Academy of Sciences and Humanities
Members of the American Philosophical Society